Sir William Fitzherbert  (15 August 1810 – 6 February 1891) was a New Zealand politician. He served as Minister of Finance, Speaker of the House of Representatives, and Speaker of the Legislative Council.

Early life

Fitzherbert was born in Dorset, England, on 15 August 1810. He was educated at Sherborne and studied medicine in Paris and London. Late in 1840 or early 1841 he married Sarah Jane Leigh in London. They came to New Zealand in 1841, settling in Wellington.

They later moved to Willow Bank a house in Lower Hutt and entertained parliamentarians there (which may account for the street's name of "Parliament Street"). The house now has a Historic Places Trust "C" classification.

Political career

Member of Parliament

He soon became active in politics, serving both on the Wellington Provincial Council and in the New Zealand Parliament. He was elected to the Wellington Provincial Council for the City of Wellington division at the 1853 New Zealand provincial elections. He was elected to the 2nd Parliament as a representative of the City of Wellington electorate, but resigned part way through the term to successfully seek election as representative for the Hutt electorate, which happened on 31 July 1858. He contested the general election on 29 December 1875 against William Hutchison and obtained 178 votes, with Hutchison receiving 38. He retained the Hutt electorate until his resignation in 1879, so that he could appointed to the Legislative Council. He also served as Colonial Treasurer (Minister of Finance) for the duration of Frederick Weld's premiership.

His younger son Henry represented the Hutt electorate from 1884–90. His other son, William, later became Mayor of Lower Hutt.

Wellington Province

Fitzherbert was Superintendent of the Wellington Province from 1871 until the abolition of the provinces in 1876. The Palmerston North suburb of Aokautere was once named after Fitzherbert, as he had promoted settlement of the Manawatu. The Fitzherbert East Dairy Factory building still carries the name these days.

Speaker of the House
He served as Speaker of the House of Representatives from 1876 until his appointment to the Legislative Council, and then as Speaker of the Legislative Council until his death.

He was appointed a Knight Commander of the Order of St Michael and St George in 1877.

Death
Fitzherbert died on 6 February 1891 at his residence in Lower Hutt. He was buried at Lower Hutt cemetery on 10 February next to his late wife, who had died on 21 August 1886.

He was survived by his daughter and two sons; William Alfred Fitzherbert) (mayor) and Henry Samuel Fitzherbert (MP). His only daughter Alice Jane married Sir Patrick Buckley in 1869.

Memorials
There are several streets in Wainuiomata bearing his name. The peak of the Eastern Hills dividing Naenae and Wainuiomata and its television relay mast is named Mount Fitzherbert.

References

External links
 

|-

|-

|-

|-

|-

1810 births
1891 deaths
New Zealand Knights Commander of the Order of St Michael and St George
People educated at Sherborne School
New Zealand finance ministers
Speakers of the New Zealand House of Representatives
Superintendents of New Zealand provincial councils
Speakers of the New Zealand Legislative Council
Members of the New Zealand House of Representatives
Members of the New Zealand Legislative Council
New Zealand MPs for Wellington electorates
New Zealand MPs for Hutt Valley electorates
Politicians from Dorset
Fellows of Queens' College, Cambridge
English emigrants to New Zealand
19th-century New Zealand politicians
New Zealand politicians awarded knighthoods